Rory Keith Kleinveldt (born 15 March 1983) is a South African former cricketer. He made his international debut in a Twenty20 International against Bangladesh in Johannesburg on 5 November 2008. In January 2019, Kleinveldt announced his retirement from first-class cricket.

Career
During the 2008 County Championship Kleinveldt played for Hampshire. Between 2015 and 2018 he played for Northamptonshire.

Kleinveldt was a star on the rise after he was named in the ODI squad to play Sri Lanka in January 2012, but he did not get a game before he was withdrawn with an injury. Two months later, he tested positive for marijuana and was immediately dropped from the Cobras' T20 campaign. Kleinveldt confessed at the first opportunity and conceded that he had "behaved irresponsibly and made a big mistake." He made his test debut on the 9 November 2012 against Australia in a drawn match.

He along with David Miller set the record for the highest 9th wicket partnership in ICC Champions Trophy history(95)

In August 2017, he was named in Cape Town Knight Riders' squad for the first season of the T20 Global League. However, in October 2017, Cricket South Africa initially postponed the tournament until November 2018, with it being cancelled soon after.

In June 2018, he was named in the squad for the Cape Cobras team for the 2018–19 season. In October 2018, he was named in Tshwane Spartans' squad for the first edition of the Mzansi Super League T20 tournament.

References

External links
 

1983 births
Living people
Cricketers from Cape Town
South African cricketers
South Africa Test cricketers
South Africa One Day International cricketers
South Africa Twenty20 International cricketers
Cape Cobras cricketers
Hampshire cricketers
Northamptonshire cricketers
Tshwane Spartans cricketers
Western Province cricketers